Fuscocephaloziopsis is a genus of liverworts belonging to the family Cephaloziaceae.

The genus has cosmopolitan distribution.

Species:
 Fuscocephaloziopsis affinis (Lindb. ex Steph.) Váňa & L.Söderstr.
 Fuscocephaloziopsis africana (Váňa) Váňa & L.Söderstr.

References

Cephaloziaceae
Jungermanniales genera